Warmsley is a surname. Notable people with the surname include:

Fred Warmsley (born 1987), American record producer and sound artist
Jeremy Warmsley, London-based musician and composer
Julius Warmsley (born 1990), American football defensive end
Titus Warmsley (born 1977), American professional basketball player

See also
Warley (disambiguation)
Warmley